The women's 4 × 100 metres relay event at the 1960 Olympic Games took place between September 7 and September 8.

Results

Heats

The fastest three teams in each of the two heats advanced to the final round.

Heat one

Heat two

Final

Key: WR = world record; DQ = disqualified; DNF = did not finish

References

M
Relay foot races at the Olympics
4 × 100 metres relay
1960 in women's athletics
Women's events at the 1960 Summer Olympics